Coral-Jade Haines (born 21 June 1996) is an English footballer who plays in the FA Women's Championship for Crystal Palace. She plays as either a midfielder or a forward.

Club career

Birmingham City
After advancing through Birmingham's Centre of Excellence, Haines made her debut for Birmingham City in 2013 at the age of 16. She scored her first goal for the team in a match against Liverpool on 1 September that year.

On 16 October 2013, at the age of 17, Haines played in a match against PK-35 Vantaa in the first leg of the 2013–14 UEFA Women's Champions League Round of 32. Birmingham defeated PK-35 Vantaa 1–0 and advanced to the Round of 16.

In April 2015, Haines scored a goal against Manchester City in the quarterfinal match of the 2014–15 FA Women's Cup. On 1 September 2015 Haines scored the game-winning goal against Bristol Academy in the sixteenth minute helping Birmingham win 2–0.

Tottenham Hotspur
In September 2017, Haines joined Tottenham Hotspur on loan until the end of the 2017–18 season. In July 2018, Haines made the move to Spurs permanent.

Crystal Palace 
On 3 August 2020, Haines signed for FA Women's Championship club Crystal Palace ahead of the 2020–21 season.

International career
Haines has represented England on the U19 national team. She made her debut for the team in October 2013 during a match against Norway.

References

External links
 
 Birmingham City player profile

1996 births
Living people
English women's footballers
Women's association football midfielders
Women's Super League players
Birmingham City W.F.C. players
Tottenham Hotspur F.C. Women players
Crystal Palace F.C. (Women) players
Women's Championship (England) players
Footballers from Leicester